The 'Coconut Cream' mango is a named mango cultivar that originated in south Florida.

History 
Developed by Walter Zill in Boynton Beach, Florida. Possibly a hybrid of Edward.

Description 
The fruit has a unique, coconut flavor with creamy, fiberless flesh.

References 

Mango cultivars
Flora of Florida